"Peppermint Winter" is a song by American electronica project Owl City. The song was released on November 22, 2010, as a Christmas single.

Meaning
Adam Young of Owl City wrote on Last.fm that it is about his "...own participation in snowball fights and sidewalk shoveling. Sleigh rides, present-giving and receiving and of course, the ingestion of marvelous Yuletide nutrition (or lack thereof), namely sugar cookies, hot chocolate and peppermint candy canes..."

Composition
"Peppermint Winter" is a light, waltz-like song that incorporates synth beats and vocals. The beat is mainly formed by jingle bells and occasional heavy drums. Piano is often featured, as well as some orchestrations, such as wooden string instruments and woodwinds. The track runs at 154 BPM and is in the key of C major. Adam's range in the song spans from the notes C4 to A5.

Critical reception
"Peppermint Winter" received mixed reviews. Becky Bain of the Idolator stated, "the saccharine love song to snowballs and sleigh rides gives us the same feeling we get when we eat too many candy canes in one sitting." The Napster blog gave the song a positive review, writing that the song "is cut from the same cloth" as his previous song "Fireflies" and calling the song "light and sugary like the candy canes on a Christmas tree". The review continues stating that while the song "might not become a classic like "Christmas Wrapping" from The Waitresses", "who can really say no to just one more Christmas song?"

Charts

Release history

References

External links

2010 songs
Owl City songs
American Christmas songs
Synth-pop ballads
Universal Republic Records singles
2010 singles
Songs written by Adam Young
2010s ballads